The bitschumbi lampeye (Lacustricola vitschumbaensis) is a species of fish in the family Poeciliidae. It is found in the Democratic Republic of the Congo and Uganda. Its natural habitats are intermittent rivers, intermittent freshwater lakes, freshwater marshes, and intermittent freshwater marshes.

References

Aplocheilichthys
Fish described in 1924
Taxonomy articles created by Polbot
Taxobox binomials not recognized by IUCN